Beautiful Creatures may refer to:

 Beautiful Creatures (2000 film), a 2000 British film
 Beautiful Creatures (novel), a book by Kami Garcia and Margaret Stohl
 Beautiful Creatures (2013 film), the film adaptation of the 2009 book by Kami Garcia and Margaret Stohl
 Beautiful Creatures (band), an American hard rock band
 Beautiful Creatures (album), debut album of the band

See also
 Beautiful Creature, an album by Juliana Hatfield